Ahti Toivanen (born 5 January 1990) is a Finnish biathlete. He was born in Polvijarvi. He competed at the Biathlon World Championships 2011, 2012 and 2013, and at the 2014 Winter Olympics in Sochi, in sprint and individual.

References

External links
 

1990 births
Living people
Biathletes at the 2014 Winter Olympics
Finnish male biathletes
Olympic biathletes of Finland